As a nickname, Dink may refer to:
 Dink Carroll (1899–1991), Canadian sports journalist
 Dink Johnson (1892–1954), American Dixieland jazz pianist, clarinetist and drummer
 Dink Mothell (1897–1980), American baseball player in the Negro leagues
 Dink O'Brien (1894–1971), American Major League Baseball player in the 1923 season
 Dink Roberts (1894–1989), American old-time banjo player
 Dink Shannon, early 20th century American cartoonist
 Dink Templeton (1897–1962), American track and field athlete and coach
 Dink Trout (1898–1950), American actor and radio personality
 Dink Widenhouse (born 1932), retired NASCAR Grand National Series driver

See also 
 
 
 Dink (disambiguation)

Lists of people by nickname